Jane Menken (born 1939), née Golubitsky, is an American sociologist and demographer known for her work in sociology in public and international affairs, population studies, social statistics.

Menken has published a co-authored book Mathematical Models of Conception and Birth(1973), and is co-editor of Natural Fertility (1979), Teenage Sexuality, Pregnancy, and Childbearing (1981), World Population and U.S. Policy: The Choices Ahead (1986), and Aging in Sub-Saharan Africa (2006). In addition, Menken was a founding member of the editorial board of two academic journals in the demography discipline: Demographic Research and Southern African Journal of Demography.

Education and career 
After completing her undergraduate work at the University of Pennsylvania in 1960, Menken continued on to complete a masters in Biostatistics from Harvard University's School of Public Health in 1962 before taking a position as a mathematical statistician at the National Institute of Mental Health from 1964 to 1966. Menken then took a position as a research associate in biostatistics at Columbia University's School of Public Health and Administrative Medicine (1966-1969) until moving to Princeton in 1969, where she held a research position in its Office of Population Research, and then Research Demographer while she completed her Ph.D. in Sociology and Demography in 1975, and began as Assistant to the Associate Director from 1978 to 1987.

In 1977, Menken became Associate Professor of Sociology at Princeton, and then full Professor from 1980 to 1987 before moving to the University of Pennsylvania in 1987 and later, the University of Colorado, Boulder in 1997, where she has been part of the Institute of Behavioral Science since 2001.

Recognition
In 1977 she was elected as a Fellow of the American Statistical Association. In 1985 she was elected president of the Population Association of America.

References

External links 
 Institute of Behavioral Science, University of Colorado Boulder

1939 births
Living people
American women sociologists
American sociologists
University of Colorado Boulder faculty
20th-century American scientists
Fellows of the American Statistical Association
University of Pennsylvania alumni
Princeton University alumni
Harvard School of Public Health alumni
20th-century American women
21st-century American women
Members of the National Academy of Medicine